Kamargaon is a village on the Pune to Ahmednagar State Highway in India.  There is a windmill farm 20 km outside town.  The village deity is Kamaksha Devi. Pincode of Kamargaon is 414005

History of Kamargaon-
Noted Maratha General Antaji Manakeshwar Gandhe belongs to Kamargaon who was killed by the Muslim chief of Farrukhnagar at the third battle of Panipat.

Recently a Marathi film Fandry was shot at location of Kamargaon lake.
the village is ancient and historic place

Kamargav also have buildings built in medieval period.
Peshwa sardar Antaji Gandhe have built up small fort which is later called as Jalka Wada. The small fort was burn by fire, however reason for it is unknown.

Second building Gadhi which was built by Sardar Andhale from Vanjari Community. He was in service of Nizamat of Hyderabad.

Third old building was erected by Andhale Sardar who was serving with Mahadji Scindia at Gawler MP.

Exactly who set village and when it is controversial part.

References

Villages in Ahmednagar district